is a 1965 Japanese chambara film directed by Kazuo Mori and starring Shintaro Katsu as the blind masseur Zatoichi. It was originally released by the Daiei Motion Picture Company (later acquired by Kadokawa Pictures).

Zatoichi and the Doomed Man is the eleventh episode in the 26-part film series devoted to the character of Zatoichi.

Plot

Zatoichi (Katsu) is given 50 lashes for illegal gambling in Shimokura. While in jail, his cellmate Shimazo (Mizuhara) claims to have been jailed on false charges of housebreaking, arson, and murder, pleading with Ichi to contact one of his influential associates who can vouch for his innocence and to inform his wife and daughter of his situation.

Cast
 Shintaro Katsu as Zatoichi
 Fujiyama Hyakutaro as Kanbi
 Kenjiro Ishiyama as Boss Jubei Araiso
 Masako Akeboshi as Ochiyo
 Eiko Taki as Oyone
 Ryuzo Shimada as Yakuza boss
 Koichi Mizuhara as Shimazo
 Sachiko Murase as Shimazo's wife

Reception

Critical response
Zatoichi and the Doomed Man currently has three positive reviews, and no negative reviews at Rotten Tomatoes.

Brian McKay, writing for eFilmCritic.com, gave Zatoichi and the Doomed Man three out of five stars and said that "[w]ith the exception of one very funny Zatoichi impersonator, and one or two excellent action sequences, Zatoichi and the Doomed Man is a surprisingly lackluster installment, due to underdeveloped characters and a truncated ending that feels as if someone edited out the film's third act using a dull katana. [...] While I'll still take a mediocre ZATOICHI movie from thirty years ago over a crappy Hollywood film of the present day, this one leaves the viewer with a sense of unfinished business on the narrative side, and rushed work on the production side. Worth seeing for the bright points mentioned above, but overall a forgettable entry to the series."

References

External links

 

"Zatoichi the Blind Swordsman, Vol. 11 - Zatoichi and the Doomed Man", review by J. Doyle Wallis for DVD Talk (25 August 2003)
Review: Zatoichi and the Doomed Man (1965)" by Thomas Raven for freakengine (July 2011)
Zatoichi and the Doomed Man (1965) review by D. Trull for Lard Biscuit Enterprises 
Zatoichi and the Doomed Man (1965) review by David Blakeslee for Criterion Reflections (7 April 2014)
Zatoichi and the Doomed Man (1965) review by Hubert for Unseen Films (13 February 2014)

Japanese adventure films
1965 films
Zatoichi films
Daiei Film films
Films set in Japan
Films shot in Japan
1960s Japanese films